is a Japanese koryū martial art which has its roots in the Toda-ryū, founded in the late Muromachi period c. 1560 by Toda Seigen (戸田 清眼).

The ryū contains an extensive curriculum of weapon-arts centering on naginatajutsu (naginata, kagitsuki naginata (a naginata with a small cross-bar beneath the blade, used for deflecting, trapping and breaking enemy's weaponry), & nagamaki, but also sōjutsu, bōjutsu kenjutsu and kusarigamajutsu.

Toda-ryu was adopted by the Suneya family in the mountainous Chichibu region.  Among other weapons, the clan apparently focused on the naginata, and its study, over many generations, was known as Suneya-kei naginatajutsu.  In the mid-1800s, Suneya Ryōsuke and Suneya Satō, husband and wife, initiated a renaissance of the martial tradition. This became the Toda-ha Bukō-ryū. From Ryōsuke and Satō, Toda-ha Bukō-ryū divided into two lines, one located in its ancestral home in Chichibu and the other in Tokyo. The Chichibu line died out in the first part of the 20th century. The Tokyo line was continued by Komatsuzaki Kotō and Yazawa Isaō, two students of the Suneya. Most of their students are unknown, and with one exception, there is little evidence that any of them continued teaching in subsequent generations. The sole exception was Murakami Hideō, who was first a student of Komatsuzaki and then Yazawa. Only one of her students, Kobayashi Seiō continued the line, which she then passed to Nitta Suzuō, the 19th generation sōke. She was followed by the 20th generation sōke, Nakamura Yoichi.

Before his untimely death, Nakamura appointed Kent Sorensen, director of the core Funabashi Dojo Japan, as sōkedairi of Toda-ha Bukō-ryū. In 2022, Sorensen, with the support of all shihan (licensed instructors), initiated a second renaissance of the school, changing the name to Tenshin Bukō-ryū heihō. Beyond the Funabashi Dojo, there are active dojo in France, the United States, Canada and Australia.

References

External links
 [ Oshinkan ]     
 Hokusei Dojo

Ko-ryū bujutsu
Japanese martial arts